Julio Fernando Vitobello (born 2 March 1957) is an Argentine politician who has served as General Secretary of the Presidency of the Nation since 2019, designated by President Alberto Fernández. Previously, from 2009 to 2015, he was head of the Anti-Corruption Bureau. He also served as General Comptroller of the Nation from 2007 to 2009 and as a member of the Buenos Aires City Legislature.

Early life and career
Julio Fernando Vitobello was born on 2 March 1957 in Buenos Aires. He studied law at the University of Buenos Aires. His political career started in the Buenos Aires City chapter of the Justicialist Party. During the presidency of Carlos Menem he was chief of staff at the Secretariat of the Interior. 

Vitobello ran for a seat in the Buenos Aires City Legislature in the 2000 local election under the Action for the Republic list, alongside, among others, Alberto Fernández. Vitobello had met Fernández earlier, during the 1999 presidential campaign of Eduardo Duhalde; they remained close associates ever since.

Later career
Upon the election of Néstor Kirchner to the presidency and the appointment of Alberto Fernández as Chief of Cabinet, Vitobello resigned from the Legislature and was appointed by Fernández as his Undersecretary. 

In 2007 he was appointed to the General Comptrolling Bureau of the Nation (SIGEN), replacing Claudio Moroni. In 2009 he was appointed Secretary of Public Ethics, Transparency and the Fight against Corruption (head of the Anti-Corruption Bureau) by President Cristina Fernández de Kirchner, a position he kept until Fernández de Kirchner's departure from the presidency in 2015.

Following Alberto Fernández's presidential win at the 2019 general election, Vitobello was invited to take over the General Secretariat of the Presidency, replacing Fernando de Andreis. He took office on 10 December 2019.

References

External links

 Official website of the General Secretariat of the Presidency 

|-

|-

1957 births
Living people
20th-century Argentine lawyers
Justicialist Party politicians
Politicians from Buenos Aires
University of Buenos Aires alumni